Primulina hiepii is a plant in the family Gesneriaceae, native to Vietnam. It is named for the Vietnamese botanist Tiên Hiêp Nguyên. The species was formerly placed in the genus Chirita.

Description
Primulina hiepii grows as a perennial herb.

Distribution and habitat
Primulina hiepii is endemic to Vietnam, where it is confined to the islands of Hạ Long Bay, a UNESCO World Heritage Site. Its habitat is in shaded cracks on the islands' limestone rocks, near sea level.

References

hiepii
Endemic flora of Vietnam
Plants described in 2000